Bravo Airways is a Ukrainian airline based at Kyiv-Boryspil.

History
In May 2019, the airline announced the end of all charter operations. A Bravo Airways Boeing 737-500 and one of their McDonnell Douglas MD-83s were seized in Kyiv and put on auction in July 2021.

Destinations
Iran
Tehran - Tehran Imam Khomeini International Airport

Jordan
Amman - Queen Alia International Airport

Lebanon
Beirut - Beirut–Rafic Hariri International Airport

Ukraine
Kharkiv - Kharkiv International Airport seasonal
Kyiv - Boryspil International Airport base

Fleet

Current fleet

As of August 2022, the Bravo Airways fleet consists of the following aircraft:

Former fleet 
 Boeing 737-300
 Boeing 737-500
 McDonnell Douglas MD-83

Incidents and accidents 
 On 14 June 2018, Bravo Airways flight 4406, a McDonnell Douglas MD-83 (UR-CPR), incoming from Antalya Airport skidded off the runway after touchdown at Kyiv International Airport (Zhuliany) during difficult weather conditions. All 169 passengers and crew on board were evacuated safely; however, the aircraft sustained severe damage and was written off as beyond economical repair.

See also
 List of airlines of Ukraine

References

External links

 

Airlines of Ukraine
Airlines established in 2012
Ukrainian companies established in 2012